Illinois Valley Central High School (also known as Chillicothe IVC, IVCHS, or simply IVC) is a public four-year high school located at 1300 West Sycamore Street in Chillicothe, Illinois, a city in Peoria County, Illinois, in the Midwestern United States. IVCHS serves the communities of Chillicothe, Dunlap (small portion), Edelstein, Mossville, Peoria (small portion), and Rome. The campus is located 15 miles northeast of Peoria, Illinois, and serves a mixed city, village, and rural residential community.

Athletics
Illinois Valley Central High School competes in the Illini Prairie Conference and is a member school in the Illinois High School Association. In the 2017–2018 school year, IVCHS joined the new Illini Prairie Conference following the merger of the Corn Belt Conference and Okaw Valley Conference.

In the IHSA, IVC has appeared in the IHSA Final Four on four occasions, most recently in 2010. IVC's first appearance in the IHSA Final Four was in the 2006 Class A Boys' Basketball State Championship where the Ghosts fell to Seneca HS 44–47. Later that year in May, IVC arrived back at the state finals this time playing for the Class A state title in boys baseball. This time IVC top Trenton (Wesclin) 8–3 for IVC's first and only State title to date. IVC returned to the final four in 2008 for the Class 2A Boys Baseball state championship against Stanford (Olympia) HS where IVC fell to Olympia finishing 2nd. IVC's most recent appearance in the IHSA Final Four was in Boys Baseball; however, IVC fell to Harrisburg 7–1 in the semifinal before finishing third against Elmhurst (IC Catholic) 6–4.

IVCHS co-ops with nearby Dunlap High School for some athletics (boys' and girls' swimming and diving).

Mascot
Their mascot is the Grey Ghosts, with school colors of maroon and grey. Different theories exist regarding the origin of the mascot name, which up until 1940 was the Maroons. The Grey Ghost was inducted into the ESPN nickname hall of fame in 1987.

Activities
IVC has a wide range of activities to offer including a large fine arts department. IVC's music department offers marching band, a concert band, a wind ensemble, and two jazz bands. The music department also offers different levels of choral music including Chorale and various ensembles.

The IVC Marching Grey Ghosts have accumulated 15 state titles since 1990, most recently in 2019 at the State of Illinois Marching Invitational.
The Marching Grey Ghosts have participated in numerous national performances including the Fiesta Bowl Parade, the Citrus Bowl Parade, and the 2007 National Memorial Day Parade.

History

Illinois Valley Central High School was formed out of the consolidation of Chillicothe High School in 1976.  The name Illinois Valley Central was chosen after a naming contest was held shortly after the consolidation.  The winning entry was submitted by Marianne Schaffner, a former resident of Chillicothe.  Chillicothe High School used to be housed in what is now the elementary and junior high school. In 1977, they constructed a new school building which sits on the corner of Bradley Ave and Sycamore St. in Chillicothe.  Surrounding communities may have also possessed high schools at some time which were consolidated into the current IVCHS.

Notable alumni
 David Batstone, theologian, writer and ethics professor
 David Julazadeh, U.S. Air Force general
 Lance LeGault, film and television actor
 Zach McAllister, Major League Baseball player
Johnston McCulley, writer and creator of the character Zorro
 William Owens, U.S. Navy SEAL
 Josh Taylor, television actor
 Ron Taylor, football player and coach

References

External links
 Illinois Valley Central High School
 Illinois Valley Central Community Unit School District 321

Public high schools in Illinois
Schools in Peoria County, Illinois
Chillicothe, Illinois